The International Business Machines Corporation (IBM), nicknamed Big Blue, is an American multinational technology corporation headquartered in Armonk, New York and present in over 175 countries. It specializes in computer hardware, middleware, and software, and provides hosting and consulting services in areas ranging from mainframe computers to nanotechnology. IBM is the largest industrial research organization in the world, with 19 research facilities across a dozen countries, and has held the record for most annual U.S. patents generated by a business for 29 consecutive years from 1993 to 2021.

IBM was founded in 1911 as the Computing-Tabulating-Recording Company (CTR), a holding company of manufacturers of record-keeping and measuring systems. It was renamed "International Business Machines" in 1924 and soon became the leading manufacturer of punch-card tabulating systems. For the next several decades, IBM would become an industry leader in several emerging technologies, including electric typewriters, electromechanical calculators, and personal computers. During the 1960s and 1970s, the IBM mainframe, exemplified by the System/360, was the dominant computing platform, and the company produced 80 percent of computers in the U.S. and 70 percent of computers worldwide.

After pioneering the multipurpose microcomputer in the 1980s, which set the standard for personal computers, IBM began losing its market dominance to emerging competitors. Beginning in the 1990s, the company began downsizing its operations and divesting from commodity production, most notably selling its personal computer division to the Lenovo Group in 2005. IBM has since concentrated on computer services, software, supercomputers, and scientific research. Since 2000, its supercomputers have consistently ranked among the most powerful in the world, and in 2001 it became the first company to generate more than 3,000 patents in one year, beating this record in 2008 with over 4,000 patents. As of 2022, the company held 150,000 patents.

As one of the world's oldest and largest technology companies, IBM has been responsible for several technological innovations, including the automated teller machine (ATM), dynamic random-access memory (DRAM), the floppy disk, the hard disk drive, the magnetic stripe card, the relational database, the SQL programming language, and the UPC barcode.The company has made inroads in advanced computer chips, quantum computing, artificial intelligence, and data infrastructure. IBM employees or alumni have won various recognitions for their scientific research and inventions, including six Nobel Prizes and six Turing Awards.

IBM is a publicly traded company and one of 30 companies in the Dow Jones Industrial Average. It is among the world's largest employers, with over 297,900 employees worldwide in 2022. Despite its relative decline within the technology sector, IBM is the seventh largest technology company by revenue, and 49th largest overall, according to Fortune. It is also consistently ranked among the world's most recognizable, valuable, and admired brands, with devoted following among many tech enthusiasts and consumers.

History

IBM was founded in 1911 in Endicott, New York; as the Computing-Tabulating-Recording Company (CTR) and was renamed "International Business Machines" in 1924. IBM is incorporated in New York and has operations in over 170 countries.

In the 1880s, technologies emerged that would ultimately form the core of International Business Machines (IBM). Julius E. Pitrap patented the computing scale in 1885; Alexander Dey invented the dial recorder (1888); Herman Hollerith (1860–1929) patented the Electric Tabulating Machine; and Willard Bundy invented a time clock to record workers' arrival and departure times on a paper tape in 1889. On June 16, 1911, their four companies were amalgamated in New York State by Charles Ranlett Flint forming a fifth company, the Computing-Tabulating-Recording Company (CTR) based in Endicott, New York. The five companies had 1,300 employees and offices and plants in Endicott and Binghamton, New York; Dayton, Ohio; Detroit, Michigan; Washington, D.C.; and Toronto.

They manufactured machinery for sale and lease, ranging from commercial scales and industrial time recorders, meat and cheese slicers, to tabulators and punched cards. Thomas J. Watson, Sr., fired from the National Cash Register Company by John Henry Patterson, called on Flint and, in 1914, was offered a position at CTR. Watson joined CTR as general manager then, 11 months later, was made President when court cases relating to his time at NCR were resolved. Having learned Patterson's pioneering business practices, Watson proceeded to put the stamp of NCR onto CTR's companies. He implemented sales conventions, "generous sales incentives, a focus on customer service, an insistence on well-groomed, dark-suited salesmen and had an evangelical fervor for instilling company pride and loyalty in every worker". His favorite slogan, "THINK", became a mantra for each company's employees. During Watson's first four years, revenues reached $9 million ($ today) and the company's operations expanded to Europe, South America, Asia and Australia. Watson never liked the clumsy hyphenated name "Computing-Tabulating-Recording Company" and on February 14, 1924, chose to replace it with the more expansive title "International Business Machines" which had previously been used as the name of CTR's Canadian Division. By 1933, most of the subsidiaries had been merged into one company, IBM.

The Nazis reportedly made extensive use of Hollerith punch card and alphabetical accounting equipment and IBM's majority-owned German subsidiary, Deutsche Hollerith Maschinen GmbH (Dehomag), supplied this equipment from the early 1930s. This equipment was critical to Nazi efforts to categorize citizens of both Germany and other nations that fell under Nazi control through ongoing censuses. This census data was used to facilitate the round-up of Jews and other targeted groups, and to catalog their movements through the machinery of the Holocaust, including internment in the concentration camps. There is much debate amongst the history community about whether IBM was complicit in the use of these machines, whether the machines used were IBM branded, and even whether tabulating machines were used for this purpose at all.

IBM has several leadership development and recognition programs to acknowledge and foster employee potential and achievements. For early-career high potential employees, IBM sponsors leadership development programs by discipline (e.g., general management (GMLDP), human resources (HRLDP), finance (FLDP)). Each year, the company also selects 500 IBM employees for the IBM Corporate Service Corps (CSC), which gives top employees a month to do humanitarian work abroad. For certain interns, IBM also has a program called Extreme Blue that partners top business and technical students to develop high-value technology and compete to present their business case to the company's CEO at internship's end.

The company also has various designations for exceptional individual contributors such as Senior Technical Staff Member (STSM), Research Staff Member (RSM), Distinguished Engineer (DE), and Distinguished Designer (DD). Prolific inventors can also achieve patent plateaus and earn the designation of Master Inventor. The company's most prestigious designation is that of IBM Fellow. Since 1963, the company names a handful of Fellows each year based on technical achievement. Other programs recognize years of service such as the Quarter Century Club established in 1924, and sellers are eligible to join the Hundred Percent Club, composed of IBM salesmen who meet their quotas, convened in Atlantic City, New Jersey. Each year, the company also selects 1,000 IBM employees annually to award the Best of IBM Award, which includes an all-expenses-paid trip to the awards ceremony in an exotic location.

IBM built the Automatic Sequence Controlled Calculator, an electromechanical computer, during World War II. It offered its first commercial stored-program computer, the vacuum tube based IBM 701, in 1952. The IBM 305 RAMAC introduced the hard disk drive in 1956. The company switched to transistorized designs with the 7000 and 1400 series, beginning in 1958.

In 1956, the company demonstrated the first practical example of artificial intelligence when Arthur L. Samuel of IBM's Poughkeepsie, New York, laboratory programmed an IBM 704 not merely to play checkers but "learn" from its own experience. In 1957, the FORTRAN scientific programming language was developed. In 1961, IBM developed the SABRE reservation system for American Airlines and introduced the highly successful Selectric typewriter.

In 1963, IBM employees and computers helped NASA track the orbital flights of the Mercury astronauts. A year later, it moved its corporate headquarters from New York City to Armonk, New York. The latter half of the 1960s saw IBM continue its support of space exploration, participating in the 1965 Gemini flights, 1966 Saturn flights, and 1969 lunar mission. IBM also developed and manufactured the Saturn V's Instrument Unit and Apollo spacecraft guidance computers.

On April 7, 1964, IBM launched the first computer system family, the IBM System/360. It spanned the complete range of commercial and scientific applications from large to small, allowing companies for the first time to upgrade to models with greater computing capability without having to rewrite their applications. It was followed by the IBM System/370 in 1970. Together the 360 and 370 made the IBM mainframe the dominant mainframe computer and the dominant computing platform in the industry throughout this period and into the early 1980s. They and the operating systems that ran on them such as OS/VS1 and MVS, and the middleware built on top of those such as the CICS transaction processing monitor, had a near-monopoly-level market share and became the thing IBM was most known for during this period.

In 1969, the United States of America alleged that IBM violated the Sherman Antitrust Act by monopolizing or attempting to monopolize the general-purpose electronic digital computer system market, specifically computers designed primarily for business, and subsequently alleged that IBM violated the antitrust laws in IBM's actions directed against leasing companies and plug-compatible peripheral manufacturers. Shortly after, IBM unbundled its software and services in what many observers believed was a direct result of the lawsuit, creating a competitive market for software. In 1982, the Department of Justice dropped the case as "without merit".

Also in 1969, IBM engineer Forrest Parry invented the magnetic stripe card that would become ubiquitous for credit/debit/ATM cards, driver's licenses, rapid transit cards, and a multitude of other identity and access control applications. IBM pioneered the manufacture of these cards, and for most of the 1970s, the data processing systems and software for such applications ran exclusively on IBM computers. In 1974, IBM engineer George J. Laurer developed the Universal Product Code. IBM and the World Bank first introduced financial swaps to the public in 1981, when they entered into a swap agreement. The IBM PC, originally designated IBM 5150, was introduced in 1981, and it soon became an industry standard. In 1991 IBM spun out its printer manufacturing into a new business called Lexmark.

In 1993, IBM posted an $8 billion loss – at the time the biggest in American corporate history. Lou Gerstner was hired as CEO from RJR Nabisco to turn the company around. In 2002 IBM acquired PwC Consulting, the consulting arm of PwC which was merged into its IBM Global Services.

In 2005, the company sold its personal computer business to Chinese technology company Lenovo and, in 2009, it acquired software company SPSS Inc. Later in 2009, IBM's Blue Gene supercomputing program was awarded the National Medal of Technology and Innovation by U.S. President Barack Obama. In 2011, IBM gained worldwide attention for its artificial intelligence program Watson, which was exhibited on Jeopardy! where it won against game-show champions Ken Jennings and Brad Rutter. The company also celebrated its 100th anniversary in the same year on June 16. In 2012, IBM announced it has agreed to buy Kenexa and Texas Memory Systems, and a year later it also acquired SoftLayer Technologies, a web hosting service, in a deal worth around $2 billion. Also that year, the company designed a video surveillance system for Davao City.

In 2014, IBM announced it would sell its x86 server division to Lenovo for $2.1 billion. while continuing to offer Power ISA-based servers. Also that year, IBM began announcing several major partnerships with other companies, including Apple Inc., Twitter, Facebook, Tencent, Cisco, UnderArmour, Box, Microsoft, VMware, CSC, Macy's, Sesame Workshop, the parent company of Sesame Street, and Salesforce.com.

In 2015, IBM announced three major acquisitions: Merge Healthcare for $1 billion, data storage vendor Cleversafe, and all digital assets from The Weather Company, including Weather.com and the Weather Channel mobile app. Also that year, IBM employees created the film A Boy and His Atom, which was the first molecule movie to tell a story. In 2016, IBM acquired video conferencing service Ustream and formed a new cloud video unit. In April 2016, it posted a 14-year low in quarterly sales. The following month, Groupon sued IBM accusing it of patent infringement, two months after IBM accused Groupon of patent infringement in a separate lawsuit.

In 2015, IBM bought the digital part of The Weather Company;, Truven Health Analytics for $2.6 billion in 2016, and in October 2018, IBM announced its intention to acquire Red Hat for $34 billion, which was completed on July 9, 2019.

IBM announced in October 2020 that it would divest the Managed Infrastructure Services unit of its Global Technology Services division into a new public company. The new company, Kyndryl, will have 90,000 employees, 4,600 clients in 115 countries, with a backlog of $60 billion. IBM's spin off will be greater than any of its previous divestitures, and welcomed by investors. In January 2021, IBM appointed Martin Schroeter, who had been IBM's CFO from 2014 through the end of 2017, as CEO of Kyndryl.

On March 7, 2022, a few days after the start of the Russian invasion of Ukraine, IBM CEO Arvind Krishna published a Ukrainian flag and announced that "we have suspended all business in Russia". All Russian articles were also removed from the IBM website. On June 7, Krishna announced that IBM would carry out an "orderly wind-down" of its operations in Russia.

Headquarters and offices 

A nickname for the company is the "Colossus of Armonk". Its principal building, referred to as CHQ, is a  glass and stone edifice on a  parcel amid a 432-acre former apple orchard the company purchased in the mid-1950s. There are two other IBM buildings within walking distance of CHQ: the North Castle office, which previously served as IBM's headquarters; and the Louis V. Gerstner, Jr., Center for Learning (formerly known as IBM Learning Center (ILC)), a resort hotel and training center, which has 182 guest rooms, 31 meeting rooms, and various amenities.

IBM operates in 174 countries , with mobility centers in smaller markets areas and major campuses in the larger ones. In New York City, IBM has several offices besides CHQ, including the IBM Watson headquarters at Astor Place in Manhattan. Outside of New York, major campuses in the United States include Austin, Texas; Research Triangle Park (Raleigh-Durham), North Carolina; Rochester, Minnesota; and Silicon Valley, California.

IBM's real estate holdings are varied and globally diverse. Towers occupied by IBM include 1250 René-Lévesque (Montreal, Canada) and One Atlantic Center (Atlanta, Georgia, USA). In Beijing, China, IBM occupies Pangu Plaza, the city's seventh tallest building and overlooking Beijing National Stadium ("Bird's Nest"), home to the 2008 Summer Olympics.

IBM India Private Limited is the Indian subsidiary of IBM, which is headquartered at Bangalore, Karnataka. It has facilities in Coimbatore,Chennai,Kochi, Ahmedabad, Delhi, Kolkata, Mumbai, Pune, Gurugram, Noida, Bhubaneshwar, Surat, Visakhapatnam, Hyderabad, Bangalore and Jamshedpur.

Other notable buildings include the IBM Rome Software Lab (Rome, Italy), Hursley House (Winchester, UK), 330 North Wabash (Chicago, Illinois, United States), the Cambridge Scientific Center (Cambridge, Massachusetts, United States), the IBM Toronto Software Lab (Toronto, Canada), the IBM Building, Johannesburg (Johannesburg, South Africa), the IBM Building (Seattle) (Seattle, Washington, United States), the IBM Hakozaki Facility (Tokyo, Japan), the IBM Yamato Facility (Yamato, Japan), the IBM Canada Head Office Building (Ontario, Canada) and the Watson IoT Headquarters (Munich, Germany). Defunct IBM campuses include the IBM Somers Office Complex (Somers, New York), Spango Valley (Greenock, Scotland), and Tour Descartes (Paris, France). The company's contributions to industrial architecture and design include works by Marcel Breuer, Eero Saarinen, Ludwig Mies van der Rohe, I.M. Pei and Ricardo Legorreta. Van der Rohe's building in Chicago was recognized with the 1990 Honor Award from the National Building Museum.

IBM was recognized as one of the Top 20 Best Workplaces for Commuters by the United States Environmental Protection Agency (EPA) in 2005, which recognized Fortune 500 companies that provided employees with excellent commuter benefits to help reduce traffic and air pollution. In 2004, concerns were raised related to IBM's contribution in its early days to pollution in its original location in Endicott, New York.

Finance

For the fiscal year 2020, IBM reported earnings of $5.6 billion, with an annual revenue of $73.6 billion. IBM's revenue has fallen for 8 of the last 9 years. IBM's market capitalization was valued at over $127 billion as of April 2021. IBM ranked No. 38 on the 2020 Fortune 500 rankings of the largest United States corporations by total revenue. In 2014, IBM was accused of using "financial engineering" to hit its quarterly earnings targets rather than investing for the longer term.

Products and services

IBM has a large and diverse portfolio of products and services. , these offerings fall into the categories of cloud computing, artificial intelligence, commerce, data and analytics, Internet of things (IoT), IT infrastructure, mobile, digital workplace and cybersecurity.

IBM Cloud includes infrastructure as a service (IaaS), software as a service (SaaS) and platform as a service (PaaS) offered through public, private and hybrid cloud delivery models. For instance, the IBM Bluemix PaaS enables developers to quickly create complex websites on a pay-as-you-go model. IBM SoftLayer is a dedicated server, managed hosting and cloud computing provider, which in 2011 reported hosting more than 81,000 servers for more than 26,000 customers. IBM also provides Cloud Data Encryption Services (ICDES), using cryptographic splitting to secure customer data.

IBM also hosts the industry-wide cloud computing and mobile technologies conference InterConnect each year.

Hardware designed by IBM for these categories include IBM's Power microprocessors, which are employed inside many console gaming systems, including Xbox 360, PlayStation 3, and Nintendo's Wii U. IBM Secure Blue is encryption hardware that can be built into microprocessors, and in 2014, the company revealed TrueNorth, a neuromorphic CMOS integrated circuit and announced a $3 billion investment over the following five years to design a neural chip that mimics the human brain, with 10 billion neurons and 100 trillion synapses, but that uses just 1 kilowatt of power. In 2016, the company launched all-flash arrays designed for small and midsized companies, which includes software for data compression, provisioning, and snapshots across various systems.

IT outsourcing also represents a major service provided by IBM, with more than 60 data centers worldwide. alphaWorks is IBM's source for emerging software technologies, and SPSS is a software package used for statistical analysis. IBM's Kenexa suite provides employment and retention solutions, and includes the BrassRing, an applicant tracking system used by thousands of companies for recruiting. IBM also owns The Weather Company, which provides weather forecasting and includes weather.com and Weather Underground.

Smarter Planet is an initiative that seeks to achieve economic growth, near-term efficiency, sustainable development, and societal progress, targeting opportunities such as smart grids, water management systems, solutions to traffic congestion, and greener buildings.

Services provisions include Redbooks, which are publicly available online books about best practices with IBM products, and developerWorks, a website for software developers and IT professionals with how-to articles and tutorials, as well as software downloads, code samples, discussion forums, podcasts, blogs, wikis, and other resources for developers and technical professionals.

IBM Watson is a technology platform that uses natural language processing and machine learning to reveal insights from large amounts of unstructured data. Watson was debuted in 2011 on the American gameshow Jeopardy!, where it competed against champions Ken Jennings and Brad Rutter in a three-game tournament and won. Watson has since been applied to business, healthcare, developers, and universities. For example, IBM has partnered with Memorial Sloan Kettering Cancer Center to assist with considering treatment options for oncology patients and for doing melanoma screenings. Also, several companies have begun using Watson for call centers, either replacing or assisting customer service agents. 

In January 2019, IBM introduced its first commercial quantum computer IBM Q System One.

IBM also provides infrastructure for the New York City Police Department through their IBM Cognos Analytics to perform data visualizations of CompStat crime data.

In March 2020, it was announced that IBM will build the first quantum computer in Germany. The computer should allow researchers to harness the technology without falling foul of the EU's increasingly assertive stance on data sovereignty.

In May 2022, IBM announced the company had signed a multi-year Strategic Collaboration Agreement with Amazon Web Services to make a wide variety of IBM software available as a service on AWS Marketplace. Additionally, the deal includes both companies to make joint investments that make it easier for companies to consume IBM’s offering and integrate them with AWS, including developer training and software development for select markets.

In November 2022, the company came out with a chip called the 433-qubit Osprey. Time called it "the world's most powerful quantum processor" and noted that if the processor's speed were represented in bits, the number would be larger than the total number of atoms in the universe.

In an effort to streamline its products and services, beginning in the 1990s, IBM has regularly sold off low margin assets while shifting its focus to higher-value, more profitable markets. In 1991, the company spun off its printer and keyboard manufacturing division to Lexmark, in 2005 it sold its personal computer (ThinkPad/ThinkCentre) business to Lenovo, in 2015 it adopted a "fabless" model with semiconductors design and offloaded manufacturing to GlobalFoundries, in 2021 it spun-off its managed infrastructure services unit into a new public company named Kyndryl, IBM also announced the acquisition of the enterprise software company Turbonomic for $1.5 billion. In 2022, IBM announced it would sell Watson Health to private equity firm Francisco Partners.

Research

Research has been part of IBM since its founding, and its organized efforts trace their roots back to 1945, when the Watson Scientific Computing Laboratory was founded at Columbia University in New York City, converting a renovated fraternity house on Manhattan's West Side into IBM's first laboratory. Now, IBM Research constitutes the largest industrial research organization in the world, with 12 labs on 6 continents. IBM Research is headquartered at the Thomas J. Watson Research Center in New York, and facilities include the Almaden lab in California, Austin lab in Texas, Australia lab in Melbourne, Brazil lab in São Paulo and Rio de Janeiro, China lab in Beijing and Shanghai, Ireland lab in Dublin, Haifa lab in Israel, India lab in Delhi and Bangalore, Tokyo lab, Zurichlab and Africa lab in Nairobi.

In terms of investment, IBM's R&D expenditure totals several billion dollars each year. In 2012, that expenditure was approximately $6.9 billion. Recent allocations have included $1 billion to create a business unit for Watson in 2014, and $3 billion to create a next-gen semiconductor along with $4 billion towards growing the company's "strategic imperatives" (cloud, analytics, mobile, security, social) in 2015.

IBM has been a leading proponent of the Open Source Initiative, and began supporting Linux in 1998. The company invests billions of dollars in services and software based on Linux through the IBM Linux Technology Center, which includes over 300 Linux kernel developers. IBM has also released code under different open-source licenses, such as the platform-independent software framework Eclipse (worth approximately $40 million at the time of the donation), the three-sentence International Components for Unicode (ICU) license, and the Java-based relational database management system (RDBMS) Apache Derby. IBM's open source involvement has not been trouble-free, however (see SCO v. IBM).

Famous inventions and developments by IBM include: the Automated teller machine (ATM), Dynamic random access memory (DRAM), the electronic keypunch, the financial swap, the floppy disk, the hard disk drive, the magnetic stripe card, the relational database, RISC, the SABRE airline reservation system, SQL, the Universal Product Code (UPC) bar code, and the virtual machine. Additionally, in 1990 company scientists used a scanning tunneling microscope to arrange 35 individual xenon atoms to spell out the company acronym, marking the first structure assembled one atom at a time. A major part of IBM research is the generation of patents. Since its first patent for a traffic signaling device, IBM has been one of the world's most prolific patent sources. In 2021, the company held the record for most patents generated by a business for 29 consecutive years for the achievement.

Five IBM employees have received the Nobel Prize: Leo Esaki, of the Thomas J. Watson Research Center in Yorktown Heights, N.Y., in 1973, for work in semiconductors; Gerd Binnig and Heinrich Rohrer, of the Zurich Research Center, in 1986, for the scanning tunneling microscope; and Georg Bednorz and Alex Müller, also of Zurich, in 1987, for research in superconductivity. Six IBM employees have won the Turing Award, including the first female recipient Frances E. Allen. Ten National Medals of Technology (USA) and five National Medals of Science (USA) have been awarded to IBM employees.

Brand and reputation

IBM is nicknamed Big Blue partly due to its blue logo and color scheme, and also in reference to its former de facto dress code of white shirts with blue suits. The company logo has undergone several changes over the years, with its current "8-bar" logo designed in 1972 by graphic designer Paul Rand. It was a general replacement for a 13-bar logo, since period photocopiers did not render narrow (as opposed to tall) stripes well. Aside from the logo, IBM used Helvetica as a corporate typeface for 50 years, until it was replaced in 2017 by the custom-designed IBM Plex.

IBM has a valuable brand as a result of over 100 years of operations and marketing campaigns. Since 1996, IBM has been the exclusive technology partner for the Masters Tournament, one of the four major championships in professional golf, with IBM creating the first Masters.org (1996), the first course cam (1998), the first iPhone app with live streaming (2009), and first-ever live 4K Ultra High Definition feed in the United States for a major sporting event (2016). As a result, IBM CEO Ginni Rometty became the third female member of the Master's governing body, the Augusta National Golf Club. IBM is also a major sponsor in professional tennis, with engagements at the U.S. Open, Wimbledon, the Australian Open, and the French Open. The company also sponsored the Olympic Games from 1960 to 2000, and the National Football League from 2003 to 2012.

In 2012, IBM's brand was valued at $75.5 billion and ranked by Interbrand as the third-best brand worldwide. That same year, it was also ranked the top company for leaders (Fortune), the number two green company in the U.S. (Newsweek), the second-most respected company (Barron's), the fifth-most admired company (Fortune), the 18th-most innovative company (Fast Company), and the number one in technology consulting and number two in outsourcing (Vault). In 2015, Forbes ranked IBM as the fifth-most valuable brand, and for 2020, the Drucker Institute named IBM the No. 3 best-managed company. During the 2022 Russian invasion of Ukraine, IBM donated $250,000 to Polish Humanitarian Action and the same amount to People in Need, Czech Republic.

In ESG, IBM reported Total CO2e emissions (Direct + Indirect) for the twelve months ending December 31, 2020, at 621 Kt (-324 /-34.3% y-o-y). In February 2021, IBM committed to achieve net zero greenhouse gas emissions by the year 2030.

People and culture

Employees

IBM has one of the largest workforces in the world, and employees at Big Blue are referred to as "IBMers". The company was among the first corporations to provide group life insurance (1934), survivor benefits (1935), training for women (1935), paid vacations (1937), and training for disabled people (1942). IBM hired its first black salesperson in 1946, and in 1952, CEO Thomas J. Watson, Jr. published the company's first written equal opportunity policy letter, one year before the U.S. Supreme Court decision in Brown vs. Board of Education and 11 years before the Civil Rights Act of 1964. The Human Rights Campaign has rated IBM 100% on its index of gay-friendliness every year since 2003, with IBM providing same-sex partners of its employees with health benefits and an anti-discrimination clause. Additionally, in 2005, IBM became the first major company in the world to formally commit to not using genetic information in employment decisions. In 2017, IBM was named to Working Mothers 100 Best Companies List for the 32nd consecutive year.

IBM has several leadership development and recognition programs to recognize employee potential and achievements. For early-career high potential employees, IBM sponsors leadership development programs by discipline (e.g., general management (GMLDP), human resources (HRLDP), finance (FLDP)). Each year, the company also selects 500 IBM employees for the IBM Corporate Service Corps (CSC), which gives top employees a month to do humanitarian work abroad. For certain interns, IBM also has a program called Extreme Blue that partners top business and technical students to develop high-value technology and compete to present their business case to the company's CEO at internship's end.

The company also has various designations for exceptional individual contributors such as Senior Technical Staff Member (STSM), Research Staff Member (RSM), Distinguished Engineer (DE), and Distinguished Designer (DD). Prolific inventors can also achieve patent plateaus and earn the designation of Master Inventor. The company's most prestigious designation is that of IBM Fellow. Since 1963, the company names a handful of Fellows each year based on technical achievement. Other programs recognize years of service such as the Quarter Century Club established in 1924, and sellers are eligible to join the Hundred Percent Club, composed of IBM salesmen who meet their quotas, convened in Atlantic City, New Jersey. Each year, the company also selects 1,000 IBM employees annually to award the Best of IBM Award, which includes an all-expenses-paid trip to the awards ceremony in an exotic location.

IBM's culture has evolved significantly over its century of operations. In its early days, a dark (or gray) suit, white shirt, and a "sincere" tie constituted the public uniform for IBM employees. During IBM's management transformation in the 1990s, CEO Louis V. Gerstner Jr. relaxed these codes, normalizing the dress and behavior of IBM employees. The company's culture has also given to different plays on the company acronym (IBM), with some saying it stands for "I've Been Moved" due to relocations and layoffs, others saying it stands for "I'm By Myself" pursuant to a prevalent work-from-anywhere norm, and others saying it stands for "I'm Being Mentored" due to the company's open door policy and encouragement for mentoring at all levels. In terms of labor relations, the company has traditionally resisted labor union organizing, although unions represent some IBM workers outside the United States. In Japan, IBM employees also have an American football team complete with pro stadium, cheerleaders and televised games, competing in the Japanese X-League as the "Big Blue".

In 2015, IBM started giving employees the option of choosing Mac as their primary work device, next to the option of a PC or a Linux distribution. In 2016, IBM eliminated forced rankings and changed its annual performance review system to focus more on frequent feedback, coaching, and skills development.

IBM alumni
Many IBM employees have achieved notability outside of work and after leaving IBM. In business, former IBM employees include Apple Inc. CEO Tim Cook, former EDS CEO and politician Ross Perot, Microsoft chairman John W. Thompson, SAP co-founder Hasso Plattner, Gartner founder Gideon Gartner, Advanced Micro Devices (AMD) CEO Lisa Su, Cadence Design Systems CEO Anirudh Devgan, former Citizens Financial Group CEO Ellen Alemany, former Yahoo! chairman Alfred Amoroso, former AT&T CEO C. Michael Armstrong, former Xerox Corporation CEOs David T. Kearns and G. Richard Thoman, former Fair Isaac Corporation CEO Mark N. Greene, Citrix Systems co-founder Ed Iacobucci, ASOS.com chairman Brian McBride, former Lenovo CEO Steve Ward, and former Teradata CEO Kenneth Simonds.

In government, alumna Patricia Roberts Harris served as United States Secretary of Housing and Urban Development, the first African American woman to serve in the United States Cabinet. Samuel K. Skinner served as U.S. Secretary of Transportation and as the White House Chief of Staff. Alumni also include U.S. Senators Mack Mattingly and Thom Tillis; Wisconsin governor Scott Walker; former U.S. Ambassadors Vincent Obsitnik (Slovakia), Arthur K. Watson (France), and Thomas Watson Jr. (Soviet Union); and former U.S. Representatives Todd Akin, Glenn Andrews, Robert Garcia, Katherine Harris, Amo Houghton, Jim Ross Lightfoot, Thomas J. Manton, Donald W. Riegle Jr., and Ed Zschau.

Other former IBM employees include NASA astronaut Michael J. Massimino, Canadian astronaut and former Governor General Julie Payette, noted musician Dave Matthews, Harvey Mudd College president Maria Klawe, Western Governors University president emeritus Robert Mendenhall, former University of Kentucky president Lee T. Todd Jr., NFL referee Bill Carollo, former Rangers F.C. chairman John McClelland, and recipient of the Nobel Prize in Literature J. M. Coetzee. Thomas Watson Jr. also served as the 11th national president of the Boy Scouts of America.

Board and shareholders
The company's 15-member board of directors are responsible for overall corporate management and includes the current or former CEOs of Anthem, Dow Chemical, Johnson and Johnson, Royal Dutch Shell, UPS, and Vanguard as well as the presidents of Cornell University and Rensselaer Polytechnic Institute, and a retired U.S. Navy admiral.

In 2011, IBM became the first technology company Warren Buffett's holding company Berkshire Hathaway invested in. Initially he bought 64 million shares costing $10.5 billion. Over the years, Buffet increased his IBM holdings, but by the end of 2017 had reduced them by 94.5% to 2.05 million shares; by May 2018, he was completely out of IBM.

See also

 List of electronics brands
 List of largest Internet companies
 List of largest manufacturing companies by revenue
 Tech companies in the New York City metropolitan region
 Top 100 US Federal Contractors

References

Further reading

 
 
 
 
 
 
 
 
 
 
 
 .

External links

 
 

   

 
1888 establishments in New York (state)
Technology companies established in 1888
American companies established in 1888
Cloud computing providers
Collier Trophy recipients
Companies based in Westchester County, New York
Companies in the Dow Jones Industrial Average
Companies listed on the New York Stock Exchange
Computer companies of the United States
Data companies
Data quality companies
Display technology companies
Electronics companies of the United States
Information technology consulting firms of the United States
Multinational companies headquartered in the United States
National Medal of Technology recipients
Outsourcing companies
Point of sale companies
Software companies based in New York (state)
Storage Area Network companies
Software companies of the United States
International information technology consulting firms